Andrea Cibo or Andrea Cybo (died 1522) was a Roman Catholic prelate who served as Bishop of Terracina, Priverno e Sezze (1517–1522).

Biography
On 20 April 1517, Andrea Cibo was appointed during the papacy of Pope Leo X as Bishop of Terracina, Priverno e Sezze.
He served as Bishop of Terracina, Priverno e Sezze until his death in 1522.

References

External links and additional sources
 (for Chronology of Bishops) 
 (for Chronology of Bishops) 

Year of birth missing
1522 deaths
16th-century Italian Roman Catholic bishops
Bishops appointed by Pope Leo X